Morum is a genus of sea snails, marine gastropod mollusks in the subfamily Moruminae  of the family Harpidae.

Species
Species within the genus Morum include:

 Morum alfi Thach, 2018
 Morum amabile Shikama, 1973
 Morum bayeri Petuch, 2001
 Morum berschaueri Petuch & R. F. Myers, 2015
 Morum bruuni (Powell, 1979)
 Morum cancellatum (G.B. Sowerby I, 1824)
 Morum clatratum Bouchet, 2002
 Morum concilium D. Monsecour, K. Monsecour & Lorenz, 2018
 Morum damasoi Petuch & Berschauer, 2020
 Morum dennisoni (Reeve, 1842)
 Morum exquisitum (A. Adams & Reeve, 1848)
 Morum fatimae Poppe & Brulet, 1999
 † Morum finlayi (Laws, 1932) 
 Morum grande (A. Adams, 1855)
 † Morum harpaforme Powell & Bartrum, 1929 
 Morum inerme Lorenz, 2014
 Morum janae D. Monsecour & Lorenz, 2011 
 Morum joelgreenei Emerson, 1981
 † Morum jungi Landau, 1996 
 Morum kreipli Thach, 2018
 Morum kurzi Petuch, 1979
 Morum lathraeum D. Monsecour, Lorenz & K. Monsecour, 2019
 Morum lindae Petuch, 1987
 Morum lorenzi D. Monsecour, 2011
 Morum macandrewi (G.B. Sowerby III, 1889)
 Morum macdonaldi Emerson, 1981
 Morum mariaodeteae Petuch & Berschauer, 2020
 Morum matthewsi Emerson, 1967
 Morum morrisoni D. Monsecour, Lorenz & K. Monsecour, 2020
 Morum ninomiyai Emerson, 1986
 Morum oniscus (Linnaeus, 1767)
 Morum petestimpsoni Thach, 2017
 Morum ponderosum (Hanley, 1858)
 Morum praeclarum Melvill, 1919
 Morum purpureum Röding, 1798
 Morum roseum Bouchet, 2002
 Morum strombiforme (Reeve, 1842)
 Morum teramachii Kuroda & Habe, 1961
 Morum tuberculosum (Reeve, 1842)
 Morum uchiyamai Kuroda & Habe, 1961
 Morum veleroae Emerson, 1968
 Morum vicdani Emerson, 1995
 Morum watanabei Kosuge, 1981
 Morum watsoni Dance & Emerson, 1967

Species brought into synonymy
 Morum celinamarumai Kosuge, 1981: synonym of Morum joelgreenei Emerson, 1981
 Morum delectum Garrard, 1961: synonym of Morum bruuni (Powell, 1979)
 Morum lamarcki (Deshayes, 1844): synonym of Morum purpureum Röding, 1798
 Morum lamarckii (Deshayes, 1844): synonym of Morum purpureum Röding, 1798

References

 Garrard, T. A. (1961). Mollusca collected by M. V. Challenge off the east coast of Australia. Journal of the Malacological Society of Australia. 1(5): 3-38, 2 pls.

External links
 Röding, P.F. (1798). Museum Boltenianum sive Catalogus cimeliorum e tribus regnis naturæ quæ olim collegerat Joa. Fried Bolten, M. D. p. d. per XL. annos proto physicus Hamburgensis. Pars secunda continens Conchylia sive Testacea univalvia, bivalvia & multivalvia. Trapp, Hamburg. viii, 199 pp.
 Mörch, O. A. L. (1852-1853). Catalogus conchyliorum quae reliquit D. Alphonso d'Aguirra & Gadea Comes de Yoldi, Regis Daniae Cubiculariorum Princeps, Ordinis Dannebrogici in Prima Classe & Ordinis Caroli Tertii Eques. Fasc. 1, Cephalophora, 170 pp
 ) Sowerby, G. B., I. (1821-1834). The genera of recent and fossil shells, for the use of students, in conchology and geology. Published in 42 numbers.
 Link, D.H.F. (1807-1808). Beschreibung der Naturalien-Sammlung der Universität zu Rostock. Adlers Erben
  Adams, H. & Adams, A. (1853-1858). The genera of Recent Mollusca; arranged according to their organization. London, van Voorst.
 Lee, H.G. (accessed 16 June 2009) The Genus Morum Worldwide

 
Gastropods described in 1798